The 2017 Asia Rugby Women's Sevens Series is the eighteenth edition of Asia's continental sevens tournament for women. The lower tier Trophy, which serves as a qualifier for the series, was held in Laos. The Series will be played over two legs hosted in South Korea and Sri Lanka. The 2017 edition of the series serves as qualification to the 2018 Rugby World Cup Sevens, with the top two qualifying.

Teams

Asia Rugby Sevens Trophy

 
 
 
 
 
 
 

Asia Rugby Sevens Series

Trophy
The women's Trophy was a single round robin held over 17–18 February at Laos National Stadium in Vientiane, Laos.

Table

Series

South Korea
Will be held 23–24 September
All matches will be held at Namdong Asiad Stadium in Incheon. All times are Korea Standard Time(UTC+9).

Pool A

Pool B

Cup

Plate

Sri Lanka
Will be held 14–15 October. All matches will be held at Racecourse International Rugby Stadium in Colombo. All times are Sri Lanka Standard Time(UTC+5:30).

Pool A

Pool B

Cup

Plate

Standings

See also
 2018 Rugby World Cup Sevens qualifying – Women
 2017 Asia Rugby Sevens Series (men)

References

2016
2017 rugby sevens competitions
2017 in Asian rugby union
2017 in women's rugby union
International sports competitions hosted by Laos
International rugby union competitions hosted by South Korea
International rugby union competitions hosted by Sri Lanka
2017 in Laotian sport
2017 in South Korean women's sport
2017 in Sri Lankan sport